Papa, Please Get the Moon for Me is a children's picture book designed, illustrated, and written by Eric Carle, published by Simon & Schuster in 1986. It tells the story of a young girl, Monica, who wants to play with the Moon. As with Carle's earlier title The Very Hungry Caterpillar (1969), merchandise has been based on this story and it has been adapted to animation.

Artwork
Papa, Please Get the Moon for Me uses a distinctive collage style, typical of Carle's work by 1986, achieved by painting tissue paper, cutting it into pieces, and assembling it. The book's aim is to educate children about the phases of the Moon.

Description
Papa, Please Get the Moon for Me tells the story of Monica, a young girl who dreams of playing with the Moon. She cannot reach it and asks her father to bring it to her. He gets a ladder and, placing it atop a huge mountain, ascends to the Moon only to discover it is too big to carry down. The Moon agrees to shrink, becoming a waning crescent, and Monica plays with it until it shrinks so small that it vanishes. As the nights go by, she watches the Moon gradually reappear in the sky, going from waxing crescent to full Moon.

The book introduces children to the lunar phases, showing the Moon "shrinking" and "growing" in the sky every night. The story also tackles concepts of wish-fulfillment and imagination.

Legacy

Reception
Publishers Weekly described Papa, Please Get the Moon for Me as "a wondrous work of art that will stand up to countless readings". It was listed among the 100 greatest picture books by the New York Public Library. The book also received special mention by the Young Critic's Award from the International Literacy Association and the Parent’s Choice Award in Illustration, both in 1986. Papa, Please Get the Moon for Me was criticized in the Journal of Elementary Science Education for inaccurately depicting the lunar cycle.

Adaptation
In 1993, Papa, Please Get the Moon for Me was adapted to television and released on VHS as part of an anthology called The World Of Eric Carle (alternatively known as The Very Hungry Caterpillar and Other Stories in the UK and Ireland). The animated collection also included The Very Hungry Caterpillar (1969), The Very Quiet Cricket (1990), The Mixed-Up Chameleon (1975), and I See A Song (1973). The collection was made by the Illuminated Film Company for Scholastic Productions, directed by Andrew Goff and produced by Ian Harvey. The classical music-influenced soundtrack was written by Wallace & Gromit composer Julian Nott.

References

Further reading

External links

 Book reviews at Goodreads
 Papa, Please Get the Moon for Me at WorldCat

1986 children's books
American picture books
Picture books by Eric Carle
Simon & Schuster books